Phygadeuon is a genus of parasitoid wasps belonging to the family Ichneumonidae.

The genus has almost cosmopolitan distribution.

Species:
 Phygadeuon aciculatus Ratzeburg, 1852 
 Phygadeuon acutipennis Thomson, 1884

References

Ichneumonidae
Ichneumonidae genera